Derek Foran (born 9 October 1989) is an Irish footballer who most recently played for Bray Wanderers in the League of Ireland Premier Division.

Career
Foran began playing football with Lourdes Celtic where he would play alongside future teammate Ian Bermingham. His form earned him a move to the club where he spent the majority of his youth football with, St Patrick's Athletic playing all the way up until he signed professional forms aged 16.
He spent the 2008 League of Ireland season on loan at Bray Wanderers before making the move permanent for the following season. Two seasons at Sligo Rovers were followed by a season long stint at Dundalk, Shamrock Rovers and back at his first club St Patrick's Athletic followed for Foran, winning a total of 3 FAI Cups, 3 League Cups, 1 Setanta Sports Cup. across those years. In 2015, he signed a two-year contract with Sacramento Republic in America. Foran returned home and signed for another spell at Bray Wanderers in January 2017 ahead of the 2017 League of Ireland Premier Division.

Honours
Sligo Rovers
FAI Cup (2): 2010, 2011
League of Ireland Cup (1): 2010
St Patrick's Athletic
FAI Cup (1): 2014

References

External links

1989 births
Living people
Republic of Ireland association footballers
Association footballers from Dublin (city)
Sligo Rovers F.C. players
Dundalk F.C. players
Shamrock Rovers F.C. players
St Patrick's Athletic F.C. players
Bray Wanderers F.C. players
Sacramento Republic FC players
USL Championship players
Expatriate soccer players in the United States
Association football defenders